Hem Heath is a village in Stoke-on-Trent just south of the Bet365 Stadium.

The nature reserve Hem Heath Woods is nearby.

Areas of Stoke-on-Trent
Villages in Staffordshire